The Shturm turret is a remotely controlled turret, developed in Ukraine, for light armored vehicles.
The turret adds  to a vehicle's weight.
The turret was developed at the Kyiv Armoured Plant, in Kyiv.
The turret is armed with a ZTM-1 30mm autocannon, coaxial 7.62 machine gun, smoke grenades, and a launcher for a pair of anti-tank missiles.

References

Remote weapon stations
Weapon turrets